Farpoint Observatory  is an astronomical observatory owned and operated by the Northeast Kansas Amateur Astronomers' League, or NEKAAL.

Summary
Farpoint Observatory is International Astronomical Union (IAU) observatory code 734, and is home to the Farpoint Asteroid Search Team (FAST), which has an international reputation having discovered more than 330 non-NEO (Near Earth Orbit) asteroids in addition to many in NEO orbits. As of January 1, 2014, Farpoint observers had contributed more than  minor planet observations to the IAU Minor Planet Center.

NEKAAL received a $56,060 grant from NASA's Near Earth Objects (NEO) tracking program to acquire and install at Farpoint the Pitt telescope from Lindley Hall, University of Kansas. After full refurbishment, the telescope now measures 27 inches in aperture (primary mirror diameter), 9 feet 3 inches in length, with weight of 1,600 pounds (725 kg).

The main-belt asteroid 23989 Farpoint, discovered by amateur astronomers Gary Hug and Graham E. Bell at Farpoint in 1999, was named for the observatory.

List of discovered minor planets

See also 
 Dan Tibbets
 List of asteroid-discovering observatories
 List of astronomical observatories
 
 List of observatory codes

References

External links 
 NEKAAL Site:Farpoint Observatory
 Farpoint Observatory, enclosure (image)
 NEKAAL observer, blog

Astronomical observatories in Kansas
Buildings and structures in Wabaunsee County, Kansas

Education in Wabaunsee County, Kansas
Minor-planet discovering observatories
Tourist attractions in Wabaunsee County, Kansas